Joseph-Dieudonné Ouagon (born 10 November 1962) is a basketball player from the Central African Republic. He competed at the 1988 Summer Olympics with the Central African Republic national basketball team.

References

1962 births
Living people
Central African Republic men's basketball players
Olympic basketball players of the Central African Republic
Basketball players at the 1988 Summer Olympics